Dolichosaurus (meaning "long lizard") is an extinct genus of marine squamate of the Upper Cretaceous Cenomanian chalk deposits of England. Sister-group relationships between coniasaurs, dolichosaurs, Aigialosauridae and Mosasauridae are an unresolved polytomy. The paleobiology of Dolichosaurus is reconstructed as similar to coniasaurs, nothosaurs, and modern sea snakes.

References

Cretaceous lizards
Late Cretaceous lepidosaurs of Europe
Fossil taxa described in 1850
Taxa named by Richard Owen
Prehistoric squamates
Prehistoric reptile genera